Springston is a small rural Canterbury town in the South Island of New Zealand 

Springston was developed around the mid-19th century, beginning with the establishment of Spring Station by James E. FitzGerald, who farmed there from 1853 to 1857, and then again from 1860 to 1867. The first building in the village was a Methodist church, which opened in 1866 (replaced by a second building in 1873). Walter Lawry, who emigrated with his wife and 10 children to New Zealand in 1862, was Methodist preacher in Springston for 50 years.

St Mary's Church, which opened in 1875, was one of the earliest Anglican churches in Canterbury. Clergyman Harry Stocker, newly arrived from Ireland, helped organise subscriptions and donations to fund the building of both it and St Paul's in Tai Tapu (1876). Both churches were designed by Christchurch architect Frederick Strouts, who later designed Ivey Hall at Lincoln University. 

The George Roy Store was formerly known as Howard and Dartnall, a store established in 1874 by Harry Lloyd Dartnall in partnership with his relative Mr. Howard. Other historic buildings include the Springston Hotel, the original Methodist parsonage, and four cottages over 100 years old.

The Springston rugby grounds at the Domain hold rugby cricket and tennis for locals and surrounding residents. The Springston Pony Club started the South Island's Springston Trophy in 1976. Springston has a pub, dairy, and community hall on Leeston Road.

Demographics 
Springston is described by Statistics New Zealand as a rural settlement.
The settlement had a population of 534 at the 2018 New Zealand census, an increase of 27 people (5.3%) since the 2013 census, and an increase of 183 people (52.1%) since the 2006 census. There were 177 households. There were 264 males and 267 females, giving a sex ratio of 0.99 males per female, with 150 people (28.1%) aged under 15 years, 63 (11.8%) aged 15 to 29, 258 (48.3%) aged 30 to 64, and 63 (11.8%) aged 65 or older.

Ethnicities were 91.6% European/Pākehā, 9.0% Māori, 2.8% Pacific peoples, 3.9% Asian, and 2.8% other ethnicities (totals add to more than 100% since people could identify with multiple ethnicities).

Although some people objected to giving their religion, 61.2% had no religion, 30.3% were Christian, 1.7% were Buddhist and 1.7% had other religions.

Of those at least 15 years old, 87 (22.7%) people had a bachelor or higher degree, and 48 (12.5%) people had no formal qualifications. The employment status of those at least 15 was that 219 (57.0%) people were employed full-time, 57 (14.8%) were part-time, and 12 (3.1%) were unemployed.

Springston statistical area

The statistical area had a population of 2,157 at the 2018 New Zealand census, an increase of 126 people (6.2%) since the 2013 census, and an increase of 504 people (30.5%) since the 2006 census. There were 729 households. There were 1,068 males and 1,086 females, giving a sex ratio of 0.98 males per female. The median age was 40.8 years (compared with 37.4 years nationally), with 456 people (21.1%) aged under 15 years, 381 (17.7%) aged 15 to 29, 1,035 (48.0%) aged 30 to 64, and 285 (13.2%) aged 65 or older.

Ethnicities were 92.4% European/Pākehā, 6.5% Māori, 1.7% Pacific peoples, 3.8% Asian, and 2.4% other ethnicities (totals add to more than 100% since people could identify with multiple ethnicities).

The proportion of people born overseas was 14.6%, compared with 27.1% nationally.

Although some people objected to giving their religion, 55.6% had no religion, 35.0% were Christian, 0.4% were Hindu, 0.7% were Buddhist and 1.8% had other religions.

Of those at least 15 years old, 369 (21.7%) people had a bachelor or higher degree, and 249 (14.6%) people had no formal qualifications. The median income was $38,100, compared with $31,800 nationally. The employment status of those at least 15 was that 933 (54.9%) people were employed full-time, 327 (19.2%) were part-time, and 39 (2.3%) were unemployed.

Education
Springston School is a full primary school catering for years 1 to 8.

References

External links 

Selwyn District
Populated places in Canterbury, New Zealand